Lola Islamovna Karimova-Tillyaeva (born July 3, 1978) is an Uzbek diplomat and philanthropist. She is the younger daughter of former Uzbekistan President Islam Karimov and his wife, Tatyana Akbarovna Karimova. Her older sister is Uzbek diplomat and business mogul Gulnara Karimova.

Personal life
Karimova-Tillyaeva earned bachelor's and master's degrees in International Law from the University of World Economy and Diplomacy in Tashkent, and later received a doctorate degree in Psychology from Tashkent State University. In January 2008 she was appointed to her current role as Uzbekistan's Permanent Delegate to UNESCO. She is married to businessman Timur Tillyaev and they have three children: two daughters and a son (Mariam, Safia and Umar).

In July 2013, various media outlets reported that Karimova-Tillyaeva had purchased a home in Beverly Hills.

In an interview with the BBC Uzbek Service in 2013, Karimova-Tillyaeva stated that she had not been in contact with her sister Gulnara for 12 years and that "There are no family or friendly relations between us...We are completely different people."

Charity work
Lola Karimova-Tillyaeva is a wellbeing activist, supporting people on their path to find greater wellbeing. In 2020, under her artist name Lola Till, she authored and published the self-care guide "Be Your Own Harmonist". The book is dedicated to advancing knowledge on wellbeing and educating the reader of the interplay between physical, emotional and mental health.

She heads two charitable organizations in Uzbekistan, which help orphaned children and children with disabilities. The You are not Alone Foundation was established by Karimova-Tillyaeva in 2002 to provide assistance to orphanages and children left without parental care in Uzbekistan. Two years later, Karimova-Tillyaeva founded the National Centre for the Social Adaptation of Children, a charitable organization which provides medical and educational assistance to children with disabilities.

Business interests
In her interview with the BBC, Karimova-Tillyaeva said that her husband has a share in a trade and transport company and that Timur Tillyaev has never been involved in public tenders, been associated with national resource industries like gas or cotton, and does not enjoy tax exemptions or monopoly status.

Lola Karimova-Tillyaeva owns property in Switzerland and made Bilan magazine's list of Switzerland's 300 richest residents.

The Tillyaev family launched a complaint against Bilan magazine in 2011, after it included them onto the list of Switzerland's 300 richest residents and reported that the Karimova sisters’ combined fortune totalled $1 billion.

In her interview with the BBC published in September 2013, Lola Karimova-Tillyaeva said she was surprised to see the 2011 figures published by Bilan regarding her wealth. She said that the figures suggested by the press were "far from reality".

In an annual list of Switzerland's wealthiest residents published by Bilan in November 2013, the assets of Timur Tillyaev and Lola Karimova-Tillyaeva were estimated between 100 and 200 million dollars. The same figures were mentioned by Bilan in 2014 as well.

In 2017, the European Investigative Collaborations and Mediapart revealed that Karimova-Tillyaeva had more than 127 million euros in offshore bank accounts in Switzerland and United Arab Emirates.

References

Living people
1978 births
Lola
People from Fergana
Uzbekistani women diplomats
Permanent Delegates of Uzbekistan to UNESCO
National University of Uzbekistan alumni
21st-century diplomats
Children of national leaders
Women ambassadors